A Dunker is a breed of dog, also known as the Norwegian Hound.

Dunker or Dunkers may also refer to:

People
 Balthasar Anton Dunker (1746–1807), German landscape painter and etcher
 Bernhard Dunker (1809–1870), Norwegian jurist, barrister and Attorney General of Norway
 Conradine Birgitte Dunker (1780–1866), Norwegian socialite and writer, mother of Bernhard Dunker
 Gösta Dunker (1905–1973), Swedish footballer
 Henry Dunker (1870–1962), Swedish businessman and industrialist
 Jens Gram Dunker (1892–1981), Norwegian architect
 Oļģerts Dunkers (1832–1997), Latvian actor and film director
 Philipp Heinrich Dunker (1779–1836), Swiss-German landscape painter and etcher
 Tommy Dunker (born 1969), West German former speedway rider
 Vincent Joseph Dunker (1878–1974), American photographer, inventor and camera manufacturer
 Wilhelm Dunker (1809–1885), German geologist, paleontologist and malacologist

Other uses
 Schwarzenau Brethren, also known as Dunkers, an Anabaptist group 
 Dilbert Dunker, an aircraft training device
 The Dunker, an underwater facility at the Underwater Escape Training Unit in Somerset, South West England

See also
 Duncker, a surname (includes a list of persons with the name)
 Dunk (disambiguation)